The Algerian ambassador in Pretoria is the official representative of the Government in Algiers to the Government of South Africa.

List of representatives

See also
Algeria–South Africa relations

References 

South Africa
Algeria